Greg Hoard is a former newspaper journalist and television sports broadcaster and the author of the Joe Nuxhall biography, JOE: Rounding Third And Heading For Home.

He joined the sports department at The Cincinnati Post in 1979 as a feature reporter and columnist, and The Cincinnati Enquirer in 1984 as the Reds beat writer. Hoard moved into television and worked for WLWT-TV in Cincinnati, Ohio, from 1990–1993, before joining WXIX-TV as sports director until 2005. He ultimately quit television work, saying he never felt comfortable in the medium.

He is currently said to be working on a book about Cincinnati Reds legends.

References

External links
 Orange Frazer Press - About Our Authors
  While working on a second book, he has served as editor of Cincinnati Gentlemen magazine since early 2006.

Living people
American male journalists
Year of birth missing (living people)